Victor Manuel Pérez Rojas (17 October 1940 – 12 November 2019) was a Venezuelan Catholic prelate.

Pérez Rojas was born in Venezuela and was ordained to the priesthood in 1965. He served as titular bishop of Tagaria and was auxiliary bishop of the Roman Catholic Archdiocese of Calabozo, Venezuela from 1998 to 2001. He then served as bishop of the Roman Catholic Diocese of San Fernando de Apure, Venezuela, from 2001 to 2016.

Notes

1940 births
2019 deaths
Venezuelan Roman Catholic bishops
Roman Catholic bishops of San Fernando de Apure
Roman Catholic bishops of Calabozo